Woku is an Indonesian type of bumbu (spice mixture) found in Manado cuisine of North Sulawesi, Indonesia.

Preparation 
Woku consists of a ground spice paste made primarily of red ginger, turmeric, candlenut and red chili pepper, mixed with chopped shallot, scallion, tomato, lemon or citrus leaf and turmeric leaf, lemon basil leaf and bruised lemongrass. The dish uses either chicken or fish that is briefly marinated in salt and lime juice before the spice paste is cooked in coconut oil. Once aromatic, the chicken or fish is mixed into the spice paste with water and a pinch of salt until cooked.

Etymology
Woku is an authentic Manado sauce that gets its name from daun woka, a kind of young coconut leaf that is usually used as a rice wrapper. Originally the initial woku dish were all wrapped inside young coconut leaf or banana leaf before being cooked, in similar fashion of cooking pepes or ketupat.

Variants
Almost any kind of meat, poultry and seafood can be made as a woku dish. The most common and popular are ayam woku (chicken woku) and kakap woku (red snapper woku). Woku belanga is a woku variant cooked in a belanga (clay pot) or any kind of saucepan, while woku daun is a woku dish cooked and wrapped in banana or young coconut leaves.

See also

Dabu-dabu
Rica-rica
Paniki
Tinutuan

References

External links
Chicken Woku Belanga recipe

 
Indonesian cuisine